Jean Gilles "Captain Crunch" Marotte (June 7, 1945 – July 26, 2005) was a Canadian defenceman in the National Hockey League with the Boston Bruins, Chicago Black Hawks, Los Angeles Kings, New York Rangers and St. Louis Blues.

Born in Montreal, Quebec, Marotte played junior hockey for the Victoriaville Bruins in Quebec before joining the Niagara Falls Flyers of the Ontario Hockey Association in 1963. He was a first-team all-star on the Flyers team that won the 1965 Memorial Cup. Both of his junior teams were affiliated with the Boston Bruins, and Marotte began his NHL career with the Bruins in 1965. In May 1967, he was part of one of the biggest trades in NHL history as one of three players sent to Chicago in the deal where Boston acquired Phil Esposito.

Marotte spent most of the next three seasons with the Black Hawks before being traded to the Los Angeles Kings in February 1970. While with the Kings in January 1971, Marotte broke rookie Darryl Sittler's wrist with a cross-check, giving him the most serious injury of his career. Marotte represented the Kings at the 1973 National Hockey League All-Star Game and scored a career-high 45 points that year. The next season, he was sent to the New York Rangers in the trade where the Kings acquired their future captain and coach, Mike Murphy. Marotte played in New York for three years. At the beginning of the 1976–77 season, Marotte was claimed on waivers by the St. Louis Blues, and spent time in the minor leagues for the only time in his career, playing for the Kansas City Blues in the Central Hockey League. The next season, Marotte jumped to the World Hockey Association to join the Cincinnati Stingers. He was traded mid-season to the Indianapolis Racers and finished his career there in 1978, retiring at the age of 33. Over his 13 seasons as a professional, Marotte appeared in 808 NHL games and 73 WHA games.

Marotte died of pancreatic cancer in 2005.

Awards and achievements
QJHL First All-Star Team (1963)
OHA-Jr. First All-Star Team (1965)
Played in NHL All-Star Game (1973)

Career statistics

External links

1945 births
2005 deaths
Boston Bruins players
Canadian ice hockey defencemen
Chicago Blackhawks players
Cincinnati Stingers players
Deaths from pancreatic cancer
Ice hockey people from Montreal
Indianapolis Racers players
Los Angeles Kings players
New York Rangers players
Niagara Falls Flyers players
St. Louis Blues players